Bawa Falls are horsetail waterfalls, situated in the Transkei region of the Eastern Cape province, South Africa.

They are located beside the village of KwaNdotshanga, near Butterworth, on a western tributary of the Gcuwa River, which in turn is a northern tributary of the Great Kei River.

References 

Waterfalls of South Africa
Landforms of the Eastern Cape